Zee Aflam is an Indian pay television channel owned by Zee Entertainment Enterprises based in Dubai, UAE, which broadcasts movies and television series originally made in Hindi, either subtitled in Arabic, Bollywood films in the Arab world, where the channel shows Hindi films and programs subtitled in Arabic and it always broadcasts Bollywood series dubbed in Arabic, Turkish films dubbed in Arabic, Hindi series dubbed in Arabic, and broadcasts around the clock a variety of Bollywood films, including romance, comedy, action and drama, starting from the latest films to the classics. The channel's broadcast area spans to Australia, the Middle East, Africa, Southeast Asia, and North America. It was launched on 6 October 2008.

See also
 Zee Alwan
 Zee TV
 Zee Cinema
 MBC Bollywood
 B4U Aflam

External links
Official Website
Zee Aflam on Twitter
Schedule of Movies

Foreign television channels broadcasting in the United Kingdom
Hindi-language television channels in India
Television channels and stations established in 2008
Television stations in Mumbai
Zee Entertainment Enterprises
Arabic-language television stations
Television stations in Dubai